Blackman High School is a high school located in Murfreesboro, Tennessee, United States which is operated by the Rutherford County Schools. The school was established in 2000 to complement the existing Blackman Elementary School.

History
Blackman High School was established in 2000 to provide a primary school for the residents living in western Rutherford County.

Campus
All classes at Blackman High have a minimum of one computer for every six students. Computers are available in the media center, foreign language lab, and technology lab. Each teacher at the school has a multimedia center that includes a TV, computer with TV out, computer network connection, and a printer.

Recent additions to Blackman High include the construction of a new classroom wing, the "G" hall, a large band room and a field area near the cafeteria.  The baseball program built a fieldhouse in 2005 and the football program finished the construction of a fieldhouse in 2010.

Athletics
The 2010 Blackman football team had a record of 10-1 and advanced the furthest ever in the playoffs, losing to Smyrna High School in the third round, for the second time that season. 

In 2013, the Blackman football team reached the TSSAA Class 6A semifinals before falling 28-16 to eventual state champion Maryville.  Blackman finished 11-3 and notched wins over Smyrna (42-0), Ravenwood (47-14), and Oakland (17-3) in the first, second, and quarterfinal rounds.

Notable alumni
Crystal Dangerfield, point guard for the Minnesota Lynx
David Price (born 1985), Major League Baseball pitcher
Jauan Jennings, NFL football player with the  San Francisco 49ers

References

External links
Blackman High School 
Rutherford County School System

Educational institutions established in 2000
Public high schools in Tennessee
2000 establishments in Tennessee
Schools in Rutherford County, Tennessee
Buildings and structures in Murfreesboro, Tennessee